La hiena (English: The Hyena), is a Mexican telenovela directed and produced by Ernesto Alonso for Televisa in 1973. Starring Amparo Rivelles, Ofelia Medina, Carlos Bracho, Nelly Meden, Enrique Rocha, Gloria Marín and Tony Carbajal.

Cast 
 Amparo Rivelles as Rita Hernández "La Hiena"; Protagonist/Main Villain (Killed by Marcial)
 Ofelia Medina as Isabel Solís
 Carlos Bracho as Emilio Martínez
 Tony Carbajal† as Abelardo Solís
 Gloria Marín† as Soledad Martínez
 Nelly Meden as Jacqueline Almedida
 Enrique Rocha† as Marcial García
 Atilio Marinelli as Raúl Carbajal
 Jorge Vargas† as Germán Rivas
 Kiki Herrera Calles as Helena Montero
 José Antonio Ferral† as Javier
 Oscar Morelli† as Capitán Pedro Montero
 Martha Zavaleta as Anabella
 Manuel Rivera as Lic. Camargo
 Alfonso Mejía as César
 Alberto Inzúa† as Lic. Fermín Mendoza
 July Furlong as Rosaura
 Héctor Flores as Tony
 Sergio Barrios as Capitán Bernard
 Socorro Avelar† as Socorro
 Leonor Llausás† as Sacra
 Sergio Jiménez† as Osmín
 Susana Dosamantes† as Dayanara
 Arsenio Campos as Roberto
 Milton Rodríguez as Guelson Dutra
 Juan Ángel Martínez as Sada

References

External links 

Mexican telenovelas
1973 telenovelas
Televisa telenovelas
Spanish-language telenovelas
1973 Mexican television series debuts
1973 Mexican television series endings